The 1924 Milwaukee Badgers season was their third in the National Football League. The team failed to improve on their previous output of 7–2–3, winning only five games. They finished twelfth in the league.

Schedule

Standings

References

Milwaukee Badgers seasons
Milwaukee Badgers
Milwaukee Badgers